Megachile lapponica is a species of bee in the family Megachilidae. It was described by Thomson in 1872.

References

Lapponica
Insects described in 1872